Morton is a city and county seat of Cochran County, Texas, United States.  As of the 2010 census, the city population was 2,006. This represented a 10.8% population decline since the 2000 Census.

History
Famous cattle baron Christopher C. Slaughter died in 1919, and in 1921, his heirs dissolved his cattle company. Slaughter's eldest daughter, Minnie Slaughter Veal, hired an agent to sell her share of the property, and this agent—named Morton Smith—founded the town of Morton. In 1923, the townsite was platted, and Smith's land office was on the east side of the square. In 1924, Morton became the county seat over a town called Ligon. The Slaughters had founded Ligon and were hoping that it would become the county seat. Cochran County's western boundary is along the Texas–New Mexico border.

Ranches continued to be sold as farmland throughout the 1920s. According to the Handbook of Texas, a family named Winder was so large that it doubled the population of Morton. Mrs. Mary Winder served as Morton's first postmistress (1924–1943). Since Cochran County was one of the last in the state to be broken out into farmland and settled, the motto for Morton became "The Last Frontier".

Morton was spared the fate of many Texas towns that shriveled and died after being bypassed by the railroad during the 1930s and 1940s. Morton being the county seat, plus having all that former rangeland newly broken out into farmland, attracted many new farming families to move in during that time, and helped Morton not only survive, but also to grow and thrive.

In 1933, Morton was incorporated, with Henry Cox as the town's first mayor.

Morton was the hometown of Lt. Col. George Andrew Davis, Jr., a World War II ace who was killed in the Korean War.

Geography
The topography of the area is generally flat, with higher elevation to the western part of the county, gently sloping downward to the east. Morton is located in what is known as the "Staked Plains" or Llano Estacado, which is in the southern portion of the Great Plains.

The center of the city of Morton (location of the county courthouse) lies adjacent to the northwest corner of the intersection of State Highways 114 and 214.

Climate
Morton has a mild, semiarid climate. On average, Morton receives  of precipitation per year. Summers in Morton are hot, with high temperatures in the 90s °F and dropping into the 60s °F at nights.

About  to the north of Morton, along Texas State Highway 214 is the Muleshoe National Wildlife Refuge, home to a large sandhill crane migration each autumn, and year-round home to a sizable prairie dog town.

Demographics

2020 census

As of the 2020 United States census, there were 1,690 people, 700 households, and 467 families residing in the city.

2010 census
As of the census of 2010, 2,006 people, 717 households, and 522 families resided in the city. The population density was 1,432.9 people per square mile. The 845 housing units averaged 603.6 per square mile. The racial makeup of the city was 61.1% Hispanic or Latino, 33.5% White alone, 4.4% Black, and less than 1% other races.

In 2010, of the 717 households, 33.6% had children under the age of 18 living with them, 51.7% were married couples living together, 15.3% had a female householder with no husband present, and 27.2% were not families. About 11.3% were a man or woman living alone over the age of 65. The average household size was 2.79 and the average family size was 3.33.

In the city, the population was distributed as 25.6% under the age of 15, 8% from 15 to 19, 6.2% from ages 20–24, 22.9% from 25 to 44, 23.1% from 45 to 64, and 14.1% who were 65 years of age or older. The median age was 34 years. For every 100 females, there were 93.7 males. For every 100 females age 18 and over, there were 92.2 males.

Education

The city is served by the Morton Independent School District. The Morton High School mascot is the Indians. The school colors are black and gold, with white.

Media
For many years, Morton was served by The Morton Tribune, a weekly newspaper that published on Thursdays, but went out of business sometime after 2010. Many of the townspeople are also regular readers of the Lubbock Avalanche-Journal, which is published in Lubbock and delivered to Morton daily.

Infrastructure
Remains of some Native Americans are also buried there, with a large marker, on the western end of the cemetery.

References

External links

 Cochran County website
 Handbook of Texas Online: Morton, Texas
 Map of Cochran County
 Photos of the Llano Estacado

Cities in Cochran County, Texas
Cities in Texas
County seats in Texas